The Baltic Republican Party (BRP; ; Baltiyskaya respublikanskaya partiya, BRP) was a political party in the Russian Federation. Founded on 1 December 1993 in Kaliningrad Oblast and lost its official status as a political party on 26 March 2003 due to the new Russian Law on political parties which requires that each party should have regional branches in at least half of the Russian Federation constituencies and at least 10,000 members in strength. An appeal was lost in February 2005 before the Constitutional Court of Russia. The main political purpose of the party was the establishment of an autonomous Baltic Republic instead of the Kaliningrad region, possibly total independence. It also wanted the old name Königsberg restored. Its leaders are Sergei Pasko and Rustam Vasiliev.

In February 2005 the constituent congress of the Kaliningrad Public Movement – Respublika took place in Kaliningrad. It has the same objectives as the BRP, its cochairmen are Sergei Pasko and Vitautas Lopata, an independent deputy of the regional Duma and local chairperson of the opposition Russian People's Democratic Union.

See also
 Secession in Russia

References

External links
 Baltic Republican Party official website
Blog in English of the Baltic Republican Party

Politics of Kaliningrad Oblast
Defunct political parties in Russia
Political parties established in 1993
Political parties disestablished in 2003
Regionalist parties
1993 establishments in Russia
Separatism in Russia
Pro-independence parties